Samuel Conti (July 16, 1922 – August 29, 2018) was an American jurist who was a United States district judge of the United States District Court for the Northern District of California.

Education and career

Born on July 16, 1922, in Los Angeles, California, Conti received a Bachelor of Science degree from the University of Santa Clara in 1945 after serving in the U.S. Army during World War II. He received a Bachelor of Laws from Stanford Law School in 1948. He was in private practice in San Francisco, California from 1948 to 1967. He was Chairman of the Civil Service Board of Appeals in Pittsburg, California from 1956 to 1958. He was city attorney of Concord, California from 1960 to 1969. He was a judge of the Contra Costa County Superior Court from 1968 to 1970.

Federal judicial service

Conti was nominated by President Richard Nixon on October 7, 1970, to the United States District Court for the Northern District of California, to a new seat created by 84 Stat. 294. He was confirmed by the United States Senate on October 13, 1970, and received his commission on October 16, 1970. On January 15, 1976, he gave Sara Jane Moore a life sentence due to her attempted assassination of President Gerald Ford He assumed senior status on November 1, 1987. Conti assumed inactive status on October 30, 2015, meaning that while he remained a federal judge, he no longer heard cases or participated in the business of the court. Conti died on August 29, 2018.

Death penalty views

Conti was known as "Hanging Sam" due to his penchant for sentencing convicts to death, at times complaining when the ruling was not legally available to him.

See also
 List of United States federal judges by longevity of service

References

Sources
 

1922 births
2018 deaths
20th-century American judges
21st-century American judges
American people of Italian descent
California state court judges
Judges of the United States District Court for the Northern District of California
Lawyers from Los Angeles
Military personnel from California
Santa Clara University alumni
Stanford Law School alumni
United States district court judges appointed by Richard Nixon
United States Army personnel of World War II